Journal of Black Studies is a bimonthly peer-reviewed academic journal that publishes papers in the fields of social sciences and ethnic studies concerning African and African diaspora culture, with particular interest in African-American culture. As of 2023, the journal's editor-in-chief is Christel N. Temple (University of Pittsburgh), the Deputy Editor is Reynaldo Anderson (Temple University), and the Assistant Editor is Taharka Adé (San Diego State University). The journal was established in 1970 by Molefi Kete Asante and is currently published by SAGE Publications.

Abstracting and indexing 
The Journal of Black Studies is abstracted and indexed in, among other databases:  SCOPUS, and the Social Sciences Citation Index. According to the Journal Citation Reports, its 2020 impact factor is 1.108, ranking it 82nd out of 109 journals in the category "Social Sciences" and 17th out of 20 journals in the category "Ethnic Studies".

References

External links 
 

SAGE Publishing academic journals
English-language journals
Black studies publications
Bimonthly journals
Sociology journals
Publications established in 1970
Ethnic studies journals